Khin Hlaing (born 17 April 1967) is a Burmese comedian, director and actor. He was nominated for the Best Supporting Actor award at the 2015 Myanmar Academy Award for his performance in the film "Is this called love?" and also nominated for the Best Supporting Actor award at the 2016 Myanmar Academy Award for his performance in the film "Nga-Ba"

Filmography

Film (cinema) 
Lae Sar (2006)
Modern Yazawin (2014)
Is this called love? (ဤအရာကိုအချစ်ဟုခေါ်သလား) (2016)
Khoe Soe Lu Hnite (2016)
Taw Kyi Kan (2017)
Thar Beluu (သားဘီလူး) (2017)
Original Gangster 2 (2017)
LadyBoy (2019)
Gyoe Yote (ချိုးရုပ်) (2019)
Jin Party (2019)
Yoma Paw Kya Tae Myet Yay  (2019)
Players (2020)

Awards and nominations

References 

1967 births
Living people
Burmese male actors
21st-century Burmese male actors